Leptophobia eleusis, the Eleusis white, is a butterfly in the family Pieridae. The species was first described by Hippolyte Lucas in 1852. It is found from Venezuela to Bolivia.

The larvae feed on Brassica species.

Subspecies
The following subspecies are recognised:
Leptophobia eleusis eleusis (Colombia, Venezuela)
Leptophobia eleusis mollitica Fruhstorfer, 1908 (Peru, Ecuador)

References

Pierini
Butterflies described in 1852